Adalbert I (c. 820 – 886) was the margrave of Tuscany from about 847 and the guardian of the island of Corsica (tutor Corsicae insulae).

He was the son of Boniface II, Margrave of Tuscany, who had been despoiled of his fiefs by the Emperor Lothair I, and successor of his elder brother Aganus. The reign of Adalbert was long and successful.

He took the side of Carloman, King of Bavaria, against Charles the Bald, King of France, in the struggle for the Kingdom of Italy, despite the latter being supported by the pope. When the Roman court persisted in this "interference", Adalbert marched on the eternal city, forced John VIII to take refuge in the St Peter's Basilica, and forced the Roman citizens to swear fealty to Carloman. Excommunication by Pope John had little effect on him.

He married Rothild of Spoleto, daughter of Guy I of Spoleto and sister of Lambert I and Guy III.

He died in 884 or, more probably 886, and was succeeded by his son Adalbert II.

References

Sources

820s births
Year of birth uncertain
886 deaths
Adalbert 1
House of Boniface